Schlagers på väg is a 2014 Wizex studio album.

Track listing
I folkparkens tjänst
Alla har glömt
Så här börjar kärlek
Sol och vår
Solen lyser även på liten stuga
Swing it magistern
April, april
Jag ska sjunga för dig
Om tårar vore guld
På söndag (with Ronja Lindberg)
Jag måste ge mig av
Kvällens sista dans
Siwan medley

Charts

References 

2014 albums
Swedish-language albums
Wizex albums